FC Tulsa was an American soccer team based in Tulsa, Oklahoma, United States. Founded in 2009, the team played in the National Premier Soccer League (NPSL), a national amateur league at the fourth tier of the American Soccer Pyramid, in the Southeast Division.

The team played its home games in the stadium at Tulsa Memorial High School. The team's colors were pale blue and white.

The team folded following the 2010 season.

History

Players

2010 Roster
Source:

Year-by-year

Head coaches
  Pilo Godoy (2010–present)

Stadia
 Stadium at Memorial High School; Tulsa, Oklahoma (2010–present)

External links
 Official Site
 NPSL Official Site

Association football clubs established in 2009
National Premier Soccer League teams
Soccer clubs in Oklahoma
2009 establishments in Oklahoma